Albert Burger (born 8 May 1955 in Rettenberg) is a German former alpine skier who competed in the 1976 Winter Olympics and 1980 Winter Olympics.

External links
 sports-reference.com

1955 births
Living people
German male alpine skiers
Olympic alpine skiers of West Germany
Alpine skiers at the 1976 Winter Olympics
Alpine skiers at the 1980 Winter Olympics
People from Oberallgäu
Sportspeople from Swabia (Bavaria)
20th-century German people